Jim Paterson (born 1934 in Townsville, Queensland) is an Australian former rugby league footballer who played in the 1950s and 1960s. An Australian international and Queensland interstate representative forward, he played club football throughout the state of Queensland during his career. He retired with the record for most games for North Queensland, having captained the side to victories over Great Britain and France.

Biography
Paterson was born in Townsville in 1934. He attended South Townsville State School and became a South Townsville rugby league club junior.

Playing career
Paterson made his first appearance for the South Townsville club's senior team in 1953. He represented Townsville in the Foley Shield competition. Whilst playing for Rockhampton in 1954 Paterson first represented North Queensland. Paterson moved to Toowoomba club Valleys where he was coached by former Kangaroo forward Herb Steinohrt. During this time he represented Toowoomba for two seasons.

After returning to Townsville in 1958 to captain-coach Souths, Paterson again played for North Queensland and was first selected for the Queensland Maroons, playing against arch-rivals New South Wales.  The following year, he helped the Maroons to win the interstate series against New South Wales for the first time.  Paterson was then selected for the Australian national team, becoming Kangaroo No. 343. and playing in all three Test matches in the series against New Zealand. At the end of the year he was selected to go on the 1959-60 Kangaroo tour of Great Britain and France. He played two Tests against France.

In 1960 Paterson joined Innisfail, who he captain-coached to victory in the Foley Shield and Paterson played for North Queensland, Queensland and Australia. The Test in Sydney against France featured five Queenslanders in the forward pack. The following year Paterson toured New Zealand with the Australian team, playing in both Tests against the Kiwis. This was after the Queensland team, of which he was now a fixture, retained the interstate crown against New South Wales. Paterson spent a third year in Innisfail but, instead of playing with all the clubs, he joined the Babinda Colts as coach. In 1963 the Herbert River coaching position lured Paterson to Ingham. Once again he represented North Queensland, including the match against New Zealand, and again went on to play for Queensland against the Blues. He returned to Townsville to coach Centrals and the Foley Shield team in 1964, taking his team to the Shield final. Paterson continued to play for North Queensland and Queensland until 1966 when he was again a member of Townsville's Foley Shield final team before retiring.

Post playing
In 2008, Australian rugby league's centenary year, Paterson was named at second-row forward in a Queensland Rugby League Northern Division 'Team of the Century'.

References

1934 births
2019 deaths
Australia national rugby league team players
Australian rugby league players
Queensland rugby league team players
Rugby league players from Townsville